Loppersum is a village and former municipality in the province of Groningen in the northeast of the Netherlands.

Geography 
Loppersum is located in the province of Groningen in the north of the Netherlands.

The former municipality was bordered by the municipalities of Eemsmond (north), Delfzijl (east), Appingedam (east), Slochteren (southeast), Ten Boer (south), and Bedum (southwest).

The population centres in the municipality were:

 Eekwerd
 Eekwerderdraai
 Eenum
 Fraamklap
 Garrelsweer
 Garsthuizen
 Hoeksmeer
 Honderd
 Huizinge
 Kolhol
 Leermens
 Loppersum
 Lutjerijp
 Lutjewijtwerd
 Merum
 Middelstum
 Oosterwijtwerd
 Startenhuizen
 Stedum
 Stork
 Toornwerd
 Westeremden
 Westerwijtwerd
 Wirdum
 Wirdumerdraai
 't Zandt
 Zeerijp
 Zijldijk

Government 
The last mayor of Loppersum was Albert Rodenboog of the Christian Democratic Appeal (CDA). He was chosen as best local administrator by the professional magazine Binnenlands Bestuur in 2013.

Monuments 
The Petrus en Pauluskerk is a national heritage site (rijksmonument) in Loppersum.

Of the borg of Ewsum in Middelstum a single defense tower remains today.

Transportation 
The Groningen–Delfzijl railway runs through the municipality from east to west with the railway stations of Stedum and Loppersum.

Notable residents 
 Titia van der Tuuk (1854 in 't Zandt – 1939) a Dutch feminist atheist and teetotal, vegetarian pacifist
 Johannes de Groot (1914 in Garrelsweer – 1972) a Dutch mathematician and topologist
 Jan Pesman (1931 in Stedum – 2014) a Dutch long-distance speed skater, bronze medallist at the 1960 Winter Olympics
 Haijo Apotheker (born 1950 in Loppersum) a Dutch politician
 Laurens W. Molenkamp (born 1956 in Garrelsweer) a Professor of physics, works on semiconductor structures and topological insulators

Gallery

References

External links

Former municipalities of Groningen (province)
Populated places in Groningen (province)
Municipalities of the Netherlands disestablished in 2021
Eemsdelta